Julian Tuwim (13 September 1894 – 27 December 1953), known also under the pseudonym "Oldlen" as a lyricist, was a Polish poet, born in Łódź, then part of the Russian Partition. He was educated in Łódź and in Warsaw where he studied law and philosophy at Warsaw University. After Poland's return to independence in 1918, Tuwim co-founded the Skamander group of experimental poets with Antoni Słonimski and Jarosław Iwaszkiewicz. He was a major figure in Polish literature, admired also for his contribution to children's literature. He was a recipient of the prestigious Golden Laurel of the Polish Academy of Literature in 1935.

Life and work
Tuwim was born into a family of assimilated Jews. The surname comes from the Hebrew tovim meaning "good ones". His parents, Izydor and Adela, provided Julian with a comfortable middle-class upbringing. He was not a particularly diligent student and had to repeat the sixth grade. In 1905 the family had to flee from Łódź to Wrocław (Breslau) in order to escape possible repercussions following Izydor's involvement in the Revolution of 1905.

Initially, Tuwim's poetry, even more than that of the other Skamandrites, represented a decisive break with turn-of-the-20th-century mannerism. It was characterized by an expression of vitality, optimism, in praise of urban life. His poems celebrated everyday life in the city, with its triviality and vulgarity. Tuwim often used vernacular language in his work, along with slang as well as poetic dialogue.

His collections Czyhanie na Boga ("In Lurking for God"; 1918), Sokrates tańczący ("Dancing Socrates"; 1920), Siódma jesień ("Seventh Autumn"; 1922), and Wierszy tom czwarty ("Poems, Volume Four"; 1923) are typical of his early work. In his later collections – Słowa we krwi ("Words in the Blood"; 1926), Rzecz Czarnoleska ("The Czarnolas Matter"; 1929), Biblia cygańska ("The Gypsy Bible"; 1933) and Treść gorejąca ("A Burning Matter"; 1933) – Tuwim became restless and bitter, and wrote with fervour and vehemence about the emptiness of urban existence. He also drew more heavily from the romantic and classicist traditions, while perfecting his form and style, and becoming a virtuoso wordsmith.

From the very beginning and throughout his artistic career, Tuwim was satirically inclined. He supplied sketches and monologues to numerous cabarets. In his poetry and articles, he derided obscurantism and bureaucracy as well as militaristic and nationalistic trends in politics. His burlesque Bal w Operze ("The Ball at the Opera"; 1936) is regarded as his best satirical poem.

In 1918 Tuwim co-founded the cabaret (comedy troupe) named Picador and worked as a writer or artistic director with many other comedy troupes, such as Czarny Kot (1917–1919), Quid pro Quo (1919–1932), Banda, Stara Banda (1932–1935), and finally Cyrulik Warszawski (1935–1939). Since 1924, Tuwim was a staff writer at Wiadomości Literackie where he wrote a weekly column titled Camera Obscura. He also wrote for the satirical magazine Szpilki.

Tuwim displayed his caustic sense of humour and unyielding individuality in works such as "Poem in which the author politely but firmly implores the vast hosts of his brethren to kiss his arse." Here, Tuwim systematically enumerates and caricatures various personalities of the European social scene of the mid-1930s -- 'perfumed café intellectuals', 'drab socialists', 'fascist jocks', 'Zionist doctors', 'repressed Catholics' and so on, and ends every stanza by asking each to perform the action indicated in the title. The poem ends with a note to the would-be censor who would surely be tempted to expunge all mention of this piece for its breach of 'public standards.'

His poem Do prostego człowieka (To the Common Man), first published on 7 October 1929 in Robotnik, provoked a storm of attacks on Tuwim both from left-wing circles, which criticized the poem's "bourgeois expression of pacifist sentiment", and from right-wing groups which accused Tuwim of calling for the disarmament of the young state.

Julian's aunt was married to Adam Czerniaków, and his uncle from his mother's side was Arthur Rubinstein.

World War II and after
In 1939, at the beginning of World War II and the German occupation of Poland, Tuwim emigrated through Romania first to France, and after France's capitulation, to Brazil, by way of Portugal, and finally to the US, where he settled in 1942. In 1939–1941, he collaborated with the émigré weekly "Wiadomości Polskie", but broke off the collaboration due to differences in views on the attitude towards the Soviet Union. In 1942–1946, he worked with the monthly "Nowa Polska" published in London, and with leftist Polish-American newspapers. He was affiliated with the Polish section of the International Workers Organization from 1942. He was also a member of the Association of Writers From Poland (a member of the board in 1943).

During this time he wrote "Kwiaty Polskie" (Polish Flowers), an epic poem in which he remembers with nostalgia his early childhood in Łódź. In April 1944 he published a manifesto, entitled "My, Żydzi Polscy" (We, Polish Jews).

Tuwim returned to Poland after the war in 1946 but did not produce much in Stalinist Poland. He died in 1953 at the age of 59 in Zakopane. Although Tuwim was well known for serious poetry, he also wrote satirical works and children's poems, for example Lokomotywa (The Locomotive; 1938, tr. 1940), translated into many languages. He also wrote well-regarded translations of Pushkin and other Russian poets.

Russian Soviet poet Yelizaveta Tarakhovskaya translated most of Tuwim's children's poetry into Russian.

Notable poems
 Czyhanie na Boga (Lurking for God, 1918)
 Sokrates tańczący (Dancing Socrates, 1920)
 Siódma jesień (The Seventh Autumn, 1921)
 Wierszy tom czwarty (Poems, volume four, 1923)
 Murzynek Bambo (The little black boy, Bambo, 1923 or 1924, published 1935)
 Czary i czarty polskie (Sorcery and Deuces of Poland, 1924)
 Wypisy czarnoksięskie (The Sorcery Reader, 1924)
 A to pan zna? (And do you know this, sir?, 1925)
 Czarna msza (Black Mass, 1925)
 Tysiąc dziwów prawdziwych (A thousand true wonders, 1925)
 Słowa we krwi (Words in the blood, 1926)
 Tajemnice amuletów i talizmanów (Secrets of amulets and talismans, 1926)
 Strofy o późnym lecie (stanzas on a late summer)
 Rzecz czarnoleska (The Czarnolas affair, 1929)
 Jeździec miedziany (The brazen rider, 1932)
 Biblia cygańska i inne wiersze (The Gypsy Bible and other poems, 1932)
 Jarmark rymów (The rhyme market, 1934)
 Polski słownik pijacki i antologia bachiczna (The Polish drunk's lexicon and anthology of Bacchus, 1935)
 Treść gorejąca (A Burning Matter, 1936)
 Lokomotywa (The Locomotive, 1938)
 Rzepka (The Turnip, 1938)
 Bal w Operze (A ball at the opera, 1936, published 1946)
 Kwiaty polskie (Flowers from Poland, 1940–1946, published 1949)
 Pegaz dęba, czyli panoptikum poetyckie (Oaken Pegasus, or the poetical panoply, 1950)
 Piórem i piórkiem (With pen and quill, 1951)

Tuwim's poems set to music
 Karol Szymanowski - Słopiewnie for voice and piano, op. 46bis (1921)
 Witold Lutosławski - Piosenki dziecinne (Children's Songs) (1952); Spóźniony słowik (The overdue nightingale, 1947), O Panu Tralalińskim (About Mr. Tralalinski, 1947), for voice and piano (also arr. for orchestra)
 Several of his poems were set to music by Zygmunt Konieczny and sung by Ewa Demarczyk, including "Tomaszów" and "Grande Valse Brillante" (this text is part of the Kwiaty Polskie poem, which references the Chopin composition several times)
 Mieczysław Weinberg - Symphony No. 8 Polish Flowers, Op. 83 (1964)
 Krzysztof Meyer - Quartettino for voice, flute, cello and piano (1966); Symphony No. 2 (1967); Spiewy polskie (Polish Songs) for voice and orchestra (1974)
 David Bruce - Piosenki for soprano, baritone and ensemble (2006) - setting of 11 songs. Piosenki at David Bruce's website
 Akurat - Do Prostego Człowieka
 Czesław Niemen - Wspomnienie
 Marek Grechuta - Mandarynki i pomarańcze

Further reading

 Keane, Barry (2004) "Skamander. The Poets and Their Poetry.", Agade: Warszawa, .
 Mortkowicz-Olczakowa, Hanna (1961). "Bunt wspomnień." Państwowy Instytut Wydawniczy.

Notes and references

External links

 Julian Tuwim at culture.pl
 English translations of Julian Tuwim’s poetry
 To the simple man (Do prostego człowieka, 1929)
 The Dancing Socrates (Sokrates tańczący, translated by A. Gilloe)
 The Locomotive (Lokomotywa, translated by Walter Whipple)
 The Saturday Night Song
 Grass
 Julian Tuwim in English Translation (translated by Pacze Moj)
 The ABCs ("Abecadło")
 Bird ("Ptak")
 Bird Radio ("Ptasie radio")
 Birds Gossip ("Ptasie plotki")
 Glasses ("Okulary")
 Kitten ("Kotek")
 Letters ("Litery")
 Little River ("Rzeczka")
 A Page from Human History ("Karta z dziejów ludzkości")
 Scherzo
 Storm (or Love) ("Burza (albo Miłość)")
 Winter ("Zima")
 Julian Tuwim We Polish Jews...
 Julian Tuwim at poezja.org
 Julian Tuwim: The Quirks and Dark Secrets of a Polish-Jewish Poet on Culture.pl

1894 births
1953 deaths
Burials at Powązki Cemetery
Polish cabaret performers
Jewish cabaret performers
Jewish poets
Polish theatre directors
Jewish Polish writers
Writers from Łódź
Polish children's writers
Polish translators
University of Warsaw alumni
Golden Laurel of the Polish Academy of Literature
Recipients of the Order of the Banner of Work
20th-century translators
20th-century Polish poets
Children's poets
Polish male poets
20th-century male writers
Recipients of the State Award Badge (Poland)